The Birds of Satan were an American progressive hard rock supergroup, assembled in 2014 as a side-project led by Taylor Hawkins of the Foo Fighters. The band was also composed of members Wiley Hodgden and Mick Murphy who previously played with Hawkins in the cover band Chevy Metal.

History
The Birds of Satan formed as an evolution of former cover band Chevy Metal.

The band's self-titled debut album was released on April 15, 2014 and pays tribute to seventies artists such as Queen, David Bowie, Wings,  Alice Cooper, Van Halen, and Aerosmith. Fellow Foo Fighters band members Dave Grohl, Rami Jaffee, and Pat Smear are featured on the album alongside the band, while Hawkins' school friend and Yes vocalist Jon Davison also appears. Prior to the album's release, the band released a promotional single titled, "Thanks for the Line."

Members
Taylor Hawkins - vocals, drums 
Wiley Hodgden - bass
Mick Murphy - guitar

Discography
 Be the bird (single 2014) 
 The Birds of Satan (15 April 2014)

Track listing

References

2014 establishments in California
2022 disestablishments in California
Musical groups established in 2014
Musical groups disestablished in 2022
Progressive rock musical groups from California